Sheep on the Road is an outdoor sculpture located in Belfast, Northern Ireland. It is a life-size bronzes of six sheep and a shepherd, sculpted in 1991 by acclaimed Northern Irish sculptor, Deborah Brown.

The sculpture was first commissioned by the Arts Council of Northern Ireland for their sculpture garden at Riddell Hall, Belfast. In 1999, it was purchased by Laganside Corporation and moved to the entrance of Waterfront Hall.

References

See also
 List of public art in Belfast

Outdoor sculptures in Northern Ireland
Sheep in art
1991 sculptures
Bronze sculptures in the United Kingdom